Young Wonder were an Irish electro-pop duo from Cork.

Career

Ian Ring is from Ballintemple and Rachel Koeman is from Watergrasshill, with a Dutch father. They met in 2012, and played at Castlepalooza in that year, and at the 2013 Latitude Festival. Their debut album, Birth, was nominated for the Choice Music Prize; The Irish Times called it "evocative and powerful, a run of songs that glisten from both slick studio shaping and some strong, deft hooks." By 2019 the duo had separated, with Ring making music under the name "Boku."

Personnel
Ian Ring (producer)
Rachel Koeman (vocals)

Discography

EPs
Young Wonder (2012)
Show Your Teeth (2013)

Albums
 Birth (2015)

References

External links 

Electronic music duos
Irish musical duos
2013 establishments in Ireland
Musical groups from Cork (city)